FedNow is a service developed by the Federal Reserve for depository institutions in the United States. It will enable individuals and businesses to send and receive instant payments. Banks will be able to build products on top of the FedNow platform. FedNow is scheduled to begin formal certification of participants of the program in April 2023, with a formal launch planned for July 2023. It will operate on a 24-hour, 365-days-a-year basis, as opposed to the government's current system that is closed on weekends and holidays. FedNow's transaction costs will be five times less-expensive than existing payment solutions, which cost merchants an average of $0.23 per transaction.

Instant payments address most of the problems that a central bank digital currency (CBDC) would solve. However, FedNow is not a CBDC, because it is not a liability of the Federal government.

References

External links 
 

Federal Reserve System